Graphantha is a genus of moths of the family Noctuidae.

Species  
 Graphantha commoda Staudinger, 1889 
 Graphantha minuta Püngeler, 1900 
 Graphantha stenoptera Boursin, 1970

References
Natural History Museum Lepidoptera genus database

Xyleninae